Sheldon & Savannah Jewett were brothers who built covered bridges, including of the Town lattice design.

A number of their works are listed on the U.S. National Register of Historic Places.

Works include (attribution):
Comstock Covered Bridge, off VT 118 over Trout River Montgomery, VT Jewett, Sheldon & Savannah
Fuller Covered Bridge, Town Rd. over Black Falls Brook at Montgomery Village Montgomery, VT Jewett, Sheldon & Savannah
Hectorville Covered Bridge, 1.8 mi. S of Montgomery Center over South Branch of Trout River Montgomery, VT Jewett, Sheldon & Savannah
Hopkins Covered Bridge, Town Rd. over Trout River Enosburg, VT Jewett, Sheldon & Savannah
Hutchins Covered Bridge, S of Montgomery Center over South Branch of Trout River Montgomery, VT Jewett, Sheldon & Savannah
Longley Covered Bridge, NW of Montgomery over Trout River Montgomery, VT Jewett, Sheldon & Savannah
West Hill Covered Bridge, 3.2 mi. S of Montgomery over West Hill Brook Montgomery, VT Jewett, Sheldon & Savannah

References

Covered bridges in Vermont
American bridge engineers
Engineers from Vermont
Families from Vermont
19th-century American people